Garrick Theatre is a West End theatre built 1889 commissioned by W. S. Gilbert.

Garrick Theatre may also refer to:
 Altrincham Garrick Playhouse
 Garrick Cinema (New York), also known as the New Andy Warhol Garrick Theatre
 Garrick Theater (Chicago) (1891–1961), built by Louis Sullivan
 Garrick Theatre (Guildford), an amateur theatre in Western Australia
 Garrick Theatre (Leman St) (1831–1881), a London theatre in Whitechapel
 Garrick Theatre (Melbourne) (1912–1937), a former theatre in Melbourne, Australia
 Garrick Theatre (New York) (1890–1932), 910-seat theatre
 Garrick Theatre (Stockport) (founded 1901), oldest "little theatre" in the U.K.
 Garrick Theatre, Sydney (1890-1920), renamed the Tivoli Theatre in 1893
 Lichfield Garrick Theatre (built 2003), a theatre in Lichfield, Staffordshire